Jorge Ramón Akapo Mambo (born 21 November 1992) is an Equatorial Guinean footballer and former futsal player who plays as a defender for Atlético Semu and the Equatorial Guinea national team.

International career
Akapo made his international debut for Equatorial Guinea in 2018.

Personal life
Akapo is a cousin of fellow Equatorial Guinean international footballer Carlos Akapo.

References

External links

1992 births
Living people
Sportspeople from Malabo
Equatoguinean footballers
Association football defenders
Equatorial Guinea international footballers
Equatoguinean men's futsal players
Equatorial Guinea A' international footballers
2018 African Nations Championship players